Senbon Dam is a gravity dam located in Shimane Prefecture in Japan. The dam is used for water supply. The catchment area of the dam is 15.4 km2. The dam impounds about 10  ha of land when full and can store 387 thousand cubic meters of water. The construction of the dam was started on 1915 and completed in 1918.

References

Dams in Shimane Prefecture
1918 establishments in Japan